Guy Suarès (1932 in Paris - February 1996) was a French actor, theatre director, theatre manager and critic.

Mise en scène (selection)
 1954 : Yerma by Federico García Lorca
 1957 : Hedda Gabler : drama in 4 acts : comedy in 1 act, Henrik Ibsen - Léon Deutsch
 1957 : Le temps est un songe by Henri-René Lenormand
 1958 : When Five Years Pass by Federico García Lorca, Théâtre Récamier
 1962 : L'Échange, Théâtre Hébertot
 1964 : On ne badine pas avec l’amour (Alfred de Musset), Comédie de la Loire
 1964 : L’Echange (Paul Claudel), Comédie de la  Loire
 1965 : Miguel Manara (O.V. de L Milosz), Comédie de la Loire
 1967 : Le repoussoir (Rafael Alberti), Comédie de la Loire
 1967 : The Chairs (Ionesco), Comédie de la Loire
 1968 : Liberté, Liberté (Flavio Rangel and Millor Fernandes, adapt Guy Suares), Comédie de la Loire
 1969 : Le barbier de Séville (Beaumarchais), Comédie de la Loire       
 1979 : Splendeur et mort de Joaquin Murieta de Pablo Neruda (adaptation)

Books 
 1979 : La Mémoire oubliée: récit
 1981 : Résidence sur la terre, Pablo Neruda, Julio Cortázar, Guy Suarès 
 1986 : Vladimir Jankélévitch, Guy Suarès, Vladimir Jankélévitch, La Manufacture, 1986

Bibliography 
 Malraux, La Voix de l'Occident, Stock, 1974
 Malraux, celui qui vient: entretiens entre André Malraux, Guy Suarès, José Bergamín, Éditions Stock, 1979

External links 
 Guy Suarès on bnf.
 Guy Suarès on idref. 
 Interview with Guy Suarès on INA

Theatre directors from Paris
1932 births
1996 deaths